The Insurance Towers (IT), is a government building under construction in Uganda. When completed, the skyscraper will house the headquarters of the Insurance Regulatory Authority of Uganda.

Location
The building is located at Plot 6 Lumumba Avenue on  Nakasero Hill, in the Central Division of Kampala, Uganda's capital and largest city. The coordinates of the building are: 0°19'04.0"N, 32°34'42.0"E (Latitude:0.317778; Longitude:32.578333).

Overview
The Insurance Towers building was constructed by the Uganda Ministry of Finance, Planning and Economic Development, to house the headquarters of the Insurance Regulatory Authority of Uganda (IRAU). Prior to the building of this office building, the IRAU was renting  of office space from Legacy Towers, at 5 Kyaddondo Road on Nakasero Hill, not far from this building, at a cost of US$10,227 per month.

The IRAU will rent out the balance of office space that it does not occupy at Insurance Towers, to raise resources to run its mandated affairs. One of the core principles that IRAU is required to meet is that it should be operationally accountable, transparent, independent, and with adequate resources. This building will facilitate IRAU to meet those objectives.

The building is expected to have two underground floors and eleven above-ground floors.

Construction
Construction of the building commenced in March 2018, with commissioning expected in September 2019. ROKO Construction Company, a Uganda-based construction company won the contract to build the tower at a cost of USh28.4 billion (approx. US$7.6 million).

See also
List of tallest buildings in Kampala

References

External links
 Website of the Insurance Regulatory Authority of Uganda

Government of Uganda
Government buildings in Uganda
Buildings and structures in Kampala
Kampala Central Division
2020 establishments in Uganda
Buildings and structures completed in 2020